The Trudeau Institute is an independent, not-for-profit, biomedical research center located on a  campus in Saranac Lake, New York. Its scientific mission is to make breakthrough discoveries that lead to improved human health.

Trudeau scientists work to discover the basic rules governing immunity (the body's natural defense system). The Institute presently employs eight research teams comprising 7 Ph.D.-level scientists, each studying some aspect of immunity. Their studies focus on immune responses to major infectious diseases, such as influenza, sepsis, and tuberculosis, as well as on the role of the immune system in cancer, asthma, allergy, arthritis, colitis, multiple sclerosis and aging.

Trudeau researchers use experimental methodologies and mouse models to conduct their research. Shared facilities include animal, flow cytometry, molecular biology, and microscopy cores, as well as biosafety level 2 (BSL-2) and 3 (BSL-3) containment laboratories.

History

The Institute was founded in 1884 as the Saranac Laboratory for the Study of Tuberculosis by Dr. Edward Livingston Trudeau as a tuberculosis treatment and research facility. Trudeau had trained as a physician after his elder brother succumbed to tuberculosis. 

Trudeau himself was diagnosed with tuberculosis in 1873. Following the thinking of the time, his physicians and friends urged a change of climate. He went to live in the Adirondack Mountains, initially at Paul Smith's Hotel, spending time outdoors, and  regained his health. 

In 1876, he moved to Saranac Lake and established a medical practice.

In 1882, Trudeau read about German physician Hermann Brehmer's success treating tuberculosis with a systematic rest cure in cold, clear mountain air. Following this example, Trudeau founded the Adirondack Cottage Sanitarium for the treatment of tuberculosis with the support of several wealthy businessmen.

In 1894, after a fire destroyed his small laboratory, Trudeau built the Saranac Laboratory for the Study of Tuberculosis, the first laboratory in the United States dedicated to the study of tuberculosis. He subsequently dedicated his life to pursuing a cure for tuberculosis and was elected the first president of the National Association for the Study and Prevention of Tuberculosis, the predecessor of the American Lung Association. He died in 1915 at age 67.

Following Trudeau's death, the sanitarium's name was changed to the Trudeau Sanatorium, and a foundation and school were established to train physicians and healthcare professionals in the latest tuberculosis treatment methods. By 1947, more than 15,000 patients had received treatment there.

The sanatorium closed in 1954, after the discovery of effective antibiotic treatments for tuberculosis.  
 
In 1957 Trudeau's grandson, Dr. Francis B. Trudeau Jr., sold the property to the American Management Association. The proceeds were invested in a new medical research facility built on Lower Saranac Lake, which became the Trudeau Institute and opened in 1964.

Trudeau's Saranac Laboratory has been restored by Historic Saranac Lake and now serves as its headquarters and a museum.

In July 2020, due to their role in assisting the regional community during the COVID-19 pandemic, the Saranac Lake Chamber of Commerce honored Adirondack Health and the Trudeau Institute as joint partners of the year. The dialogue included a look at what role the Institute plays in global research into pandemic vaccines as the award was presented.

References

External links
Official site
Historic Saranac Lake - the Saranac Laboratory

Adirondacks
Biotechnology organizations
Medical research institutes in the United States
Saranac Lake, New York
Organizations established in 1884
Non-profit organizations based in New York (state)
Research institutes in New York (state)